The 2013 Women's Junior Pan-American Volleyball Cup was the second edition of the bi-annual women's volleyball tournament, played by eight countries from March 18 – 23, 2013 in Havana, Cuba.

This was the last qualifier to the 2013 FIVB Women's Junior World Championship for American teams, Puerto Rico earned the last berth winning Pool B over hosts Cuba

Competing Nations
Teams who were able to participate in this tournament are those who took part at their respective continental junior championships, South America and NORCECA. Puerto Rico entered after Argentina declined to participate and Guatemala and Nicaragua failed to apply.

Competition format
The competition format for the 2013 Junior Pan American Volleyball Cup divides the 8 participating teams in 2 groups of 4, a seeded group consisting of countries already qualified to the 2013 FIVB Women's Junior World Championship, and another group of non-qualified countries. Both groups will play a Round-Robyn round after which the best team from Group B will earn the last berth to the World Championship.

The best two teams from Group A will advance to the semifinals, the best two teams from Group B will play the quarterfinals against the worst two teams from Pool A. The worst two from Group B will play the classification matches from 5th to 8th.

Pool standing procedure
Match won 3–0: 5 points for the winner, 0 point for the loser
Match won 3–1: 4 points for the winner, 1 points for the loser
Match won 3–2: 3 points for the winner, 2 points for the loser
In case of tie, the teams were classified according to the following criteria:
points ratio and sets ratio

Preliminary round

Group A

Group B

Final round

Championship bracket

Quarterfinals

Classification 5/8

Semifinals

Seventh place match

Fifth place match

Bronze medal match

Final

Final standing

Individual awards

Most Valuable Player
 
Best Scorer
 
Best Spiker
 
Best Blocker
 
Best Server
 
Best Digger
 
Best Setter
 
Best Receiver
 
Best Libero

References

Women's Pan-American Volleyball Cup
Junior Pan-American Volleyball Cup
Women's Junior Pan-American
Volleyball